The men's 50 kilometres walk  event at the 1932 Summer Olympic Games took place August 3. The final was won by Tommy Green of Great Britain.

Results

Key: DNF = Did not finish, OR = Olympic record

References

Athletics at the 1932 Summer Olympics
Racewalking at the Olympics
Men's events at the 1932 Summer Olympics